Jafarabad (also Romanized as Ja‘farābād; also known as Kheyrābād) is a village in Var Posht Rural District, in the Central District of Tiran and Karvan County, Isfahan Province, Iran. At the 2006 census, its population was 746, in 201 families.

References 

Populated places in Tiran and Karvan County